Agnes Morton  (6 March 1872 – 5 April 1952) was a British female tennis player. She twice reached the Ladies Singles finals at the 1908 and 1909 Wimbledon Championships and claimed victory in 1914 in Ladies Doubles with partner Elizabeth Ryan. She placed fourth at the 1908 Summer Olympics in Ladies Lawn Tennis. In 1903, she was described by A. Wallis Myers as a 'careful, steady and improving player'.

Her other career singles highlights included winning the Redhill Open Tournament nine times (1903-04, 1906-07, 1909-12, 1914).

Grand Slam finals

Singles (2 runners-up)

1This was the all-comers final as May Sutton Bundy did not defend her 1907 Wimbledon title, which resulted in the winner of the all-comers final winning the challenge round and, thus, Wimbledon in 1908 by walkover.
2This was the all-comers final as Charlotte Cooper Sterry did not defend her 1908 Wimbledon title, which resulted in the winner of the all-comers final winning the challenge round and, thus, Wimbledon in 1909 by walkover.

Doubles (1 title)

References

External links

 

1872 births
1952 deaths
English female tennis players
Olympic tennis players of Great Britain
People from Halstead
Tennis players at the 1908 Summer Olympics
Wimbledon champions (pre-Open Era)
Grand Slam (tennis) champions in women's doubles
British female tennis players
Tennis people from Essex